Thomas Gregory (born 10 November 1995) is an English singer and songwriter. He released his album Heaven in a World So Cold in 2020.

Early life 
Tom Gregory was born in Blackpool, England. During his childhood, he notes that some of his biggest idols are Keane, The La's, OneRepublic and Phoenix, referring to the latter as "One of the best French groups from the last twenty years". These musical inspirations Gregory acclaims to the records given to him by his father, and started his complete obsession with music. Growing up on the outskirts of Blackpool, opportunities presented little more than listening to handed down CDs and writing songs in his bedroom; something that the young singer says helped him to learn his craft. He completed his formal school education in the local independent Rossall School.

Career 
In 2013,  Gregory appeared in the second season of The Voice UK but did not make it to the final stages. This failure however did not weaken him, and eventually encouraged the young Brit to pursue a full time career.

In 2016, and years after his knock back on The Voice, he appeared in the popular BBC series The A Word, a drama based on the family dynamics of raising an autistic child. He played the role of Luke Taylor, the boyfriend of Rebecca Hughes and half sister of the main character. Gregory sites that this role was crucial in his singing career as it allowed him to earn extra money in order to fund his music.

After a few years of working part time jobs and travelling around the UK and Germany, he was eventually picked up by German indie record label Kontor Records. He went on later that year to release his first single "Run to You". The track became an instant success and soon reached over 20 million streams, and secured a top 30 chart position on radio. After gathering momentum touring in Germany, he then released five more singles, did two more tours throughout Germany and supported A-ha.

After previous success with his song "Small Steps", his single "Fingertips" reached the Top 40 Official Charts in Austria and Germany. It also became his most successful solo release, peaking at number 1 on the Official German Radio Chart, number 5 in the Official French Radio Chart and currently gathering over 100 million streams.

His debut album, Heaven in a World So Cold was released. As well as amassing more than 350 million streams to date, various singles from the album have since gone on to credit 8 gold and 2 platinum award certifications across 5 countries.

Discography

Albums

Singles 

*Did not appear in the official Belgian Ultratop 50 charts, but rather in the bubbling under Ultratip charts.

Filmography 
2015: The A Word as Luke Taylor (BBC TV series)

References

External links 
 

1995 births
21st-century English male actors
English male television actors
English male singer-songwriters
Living people
21st-century English singers
21st-century British male singers
The Voice UK contestants